is a professional Japanese baseball player. He plays catcher for the Hokkaido Nippon-Ham Fighters.

External links

 NPB.com

1998 births
Living people
Baseball people from Fukuoka Prefecture
Japanese baseball players
Jobu University alumni
Nippon Professional Baseball catchers
Hokkaido Nippon-Ham Fighters players
People from Yame, Fukuoka